Kramarzyny  (Cashubian  Kramarzënë)() is a village in the administrative district of Gmina Tuchomie, within Bytów County, Pomeranian Voivodeship, in northern Poland.

The village has a population of 586.

References

Kramarzyny